KIND Financial is an American company focused on providing financial technology services for the cannabis industry.

In 2013, David Dinenberg founded Kind Banking to be the "Wells Fargo of the marijuana banking industry" before changing the name of the company to Kind Financial in late 2014. Dinenberg also serves as CEO of KIND, which has its headquarters in Los Angeles, California.

KIND's technology platform provides tools focused on cannabis tracking and compliance for cultivators, dispensaries, and regulatory agencies in the cannabis industry. These tools manage the entire cannabis business life-cycle ensuring that transactions are safe, secure and remain in compliance with the rules, regulations, laws and guidelines governing marijuana-related businesses with the federal guidelines set forth by FinCEN, the Cole Memorandums and related laws and regulations.

KIND's seed-to-sale tracking and compliance platform, Agrisoft Seed to Sale, integrates with KIND's cash-management and order-taking kiosk as well as KIND Pay, its secure platform being developed for cash-free mobile payments and customer loyalty programs. Together, the KIND platform provides an end-to-end application to close the loop between marijuana-related businesses and financial institutions.

Microsoft Partnership
On June 17, 2016 Microsoft announced its partnership with Kind in assisting with the tracking of legalized cannabis sales.

References
https://www.bbc.com/news/business-36545858

American companies established in 2013
Companies based in Los Angeles